The Diocese of Chicoutimi is a Roman Catholic diocese in Quebec, centred on the borough of Chicoutimi in the city of Saguenay.  It is part of the ecclesiastical province of Quebec.

On 18 November 2017, Pope Francis appointed René Guay, a priest of Chicoutimi, as the new bishop.

Bishops
 Dominique Racine (1878-1888)
 Louis Nazaire Bégin (1888-1892), appointed Coadjutor Archbishop of Québec; future Cardinal
 Michel-Thomas Labrecque (1892-1927)
 Charles-Antonelli Lamarche (1928-1940)
 Georges-Arthur Melançon (1940-1961)
 Marius Paré (1961-1979)
 Jean-Guy Couture (1979-2004)
 André Rivest (2004-2017)
 René Guay (2017- )

Coadjutor bishop
 Marius Paré (1960-1961)

Auxiliary bishops
 Marius Paré (1956-1960), appointed Coadjutor here
 Roch Pedneault (1974-2002)

Other priests of this diocese who became bishops
 Bertrand Blanchet, appointed Bishop of Gaspé, Québec in 1973
 Serge Patrick Poitras, appointed Bishop of Timmins, Ontario in 2012

References

 

Catholic Church in Quebec
Chicoutimi
Saguenay, Quebec
Organizations based in Quebec